Juan Carlos Barrón Monsiváis (born 27 March 1977) is a Mexican football manager and former player.

References

External links

1977 births
Living people
Sportspeople from Monterrey
Footballers from Nuevo León
Association football defenders
C.F. Monterrey players
Mexican footballers